Elliot Mitchell Dee (born 7 March 1994) is a Welsh professional rugby union player who plays as a hooker for the Dragons and the Wales national team.

Early life 
Dee was born in Newport and attended Newbridge Comprehensive School.

Club career 

Dee began his rugby career at Penallta RFC, and got his first Wales cap playing for the Under 18s side.

He played senior rugby in the Premiership and Premiership for Newbridge, Pontypool, Bedwas and Cross Keys before joining the Dragons as a professional.

International 
Dee is a former Wales under-20 international. He was included in the Wales players squad for the 2017 Autumn internationals. He was included in the Wales senior squad for the first time for the 2017 Autumn Series and made his debut off the bench in the 13-6 win over Georgia on 18 November 2017. His first start for Wales came in Round 4 of the 2018 6 Nations campaign against Italy. He came off the bench in the four other fixtures.

It was a similar situation in the 2019 Grand Slam season, when he started in the win over Italy in Rome and came on as a replacement in the other four fixtures. He played a part in 13 of Wales’ record run of 14 successive victories 2018-19.

International tries

References

External links 
Dragons profile

1994 births
Living people
Bedwas RFC players
Dragons RFC players
Rugby union players from Newport, Wales
Wales international rugby union players
Welsh rugby union players
Rugby union hookers